Pattison is a city in Waller County, Texas, United States. As of the 2010 census, the population was 472.

Geography

Pattison is located at  (29.819385, –95.983413).

According to the United States Census Bureau, the city has a total area of 3.2 square miles (8.4 km), all of it land.

Climate

The climate in this area is characterized by hot, humid summers and generally mild to cool winters.  According to the Köppen Climate Classification system, Pattison has a humid subtropical climate, abbreviated "Cfa" on climate maps.

Demographics

As of the census of 2000, there were 447 people, 166 households, and 126 families residing in the city. The population density was 137.8 people per square mile (53.3/km). There were 186 housing units at an average density of 57.3/sq mi (22.2/km). The racial makeup of the city was 81.43% White, 9.40% African American, 0.45% Native American, 0.89% Asian, 5.82% from other races, and 2.01% from two or more races. Hispanic or Latino of any race were 19.24% of the population.

There were 166 households, out of which 36.1% had children under the age of 18 living with them, 62.7% were married couples living together, 12.0% had a female householder with no husband present, and 23.5% were non-families. 21.7% of all households were made up of individuals, and 9.6% had someone living alone who was 65 years of age or older. The average household size was 2.69 and the average family size was 3.14.

In the city, the population was spread out, with 26.4% under the age of 18, 7.4% from 18 to 24, 25.3% from 25 to 44, 26.0% from 45 to 64, and 15.0% who were 65 years of age or older. The median age was 40 years. For every 100 females, there were 87.8 males. For every 100 females age 18 and over, there were 80.8 males.

The median income for a household in the city was $43,250, and the median income for a family was $55,938. Males had a median income of $35,833 versus $38,375 for females. The per capita income for the city was $17,982. About 5.7% of families and 6.6% of the population were below the poverty line, including 3.8% of those under age 18 and 7.0% of those age 65 or over.

Government and infrastructure 
(Current as of 3/25/22)

Mayor - Joe Garcia

Council Member #1 – Wayne Kircher

Council Member #2 – Frank Cobio, Jr.

Council Member #3 – Robert MacCallum

Council Member #4 / Mayor Pro Tem – Seth Stokes

Council Member #5 – Randall Flowers

The United States Postal Service operates the Pattison Post Office at 3637 2nd Street.

Education

The City of Pattison is served by the Royal Independent School District.

References

External links
 Pattison, Texas website
 

Cities in Waller County, Texas
Cities in Texas
Greater Houston